Uncle Nino is a 2003 American film directed by Robert Shallcross, produced by David James, and starring Joe Mantegna, Anne Archer, Pierrino Mascarino, Trevor Morgan, and Gia Mantegna.

The film deals with a dysfunctional family, who have lost their way, and a distant relative played by Pierrino Mascarino intends to bring them closer together.

Plot
A father, Robert Micelli (Joe Mantegna), has become a stranger to his family and thinks only of his lawn and job. After decades of no contact, Robert's Uncle Nino (Pierrino Mascarino) flies to America for an unexpected visit, with a suitcase full of homemade Italian wine. Nino helps the family realize the true value of family.

Cast
 Joe Mantegna as Robert Micelli
 Pierrino Mascarino as Uncle Nino
 Anne Archer as Marie
 Trevor Morgan as Bobby
 Duke Doyle as Bones
 Daniel Adebayo as Joey
 Gia Mantegna as Gia
 Gianfranco Landi as Italian Truck Driver
 Jessica Szohr as MC
 Maureen Gallagher as Ellen

References

External links
 
 
 
 

2003 films
American independent films
2000s English-language films
2000s American films